Rosemount is a rural locality in the Sunshine Coast Region, Queensland, Australia.

Geography 
Rosemount is located immediately east of Nambour, bordered on its north, east and south by the Petrie and Paynter Creeks.

Upper Rosemount Road roughly follows the ridge of the Rosemount Spur, which is a watershed for both the creeks. 'Rosemount' was an early cane farm on Petrie Creek.

As Rosemount is positioned between the major urban centres of Nambour and Maroochydore it has attracted some highly priced rural and residential developments. Most, however, are in a more modest range.

History
In the 1880s farm selections were taken up, almost all for cane-growing.

Rosemount Provisional opened on 7 April 1886. On 1 January 1909 it became Rosemount State School. It closed on 16 September 1946. It was also known as Sylvania School.

References

External links
 

Suburbs of the Sunshine Coast Region
Localities in Queensland